Cookstown/Kirby Field Aerodrome  is located  south southwest of Cookstown, Ontario, Canada.

References

Registered aerodromes in Ontario